Belgium is scheduled to compete at the 2019 European Games, in Minsk, Belarus from 21 to 30 June 2019. Belgium has previously competed at the 2015 European Games in Baku, Azerbaijan, where it won 11 medals, including four golds.
The Belgian Olympic Committee sent a total of 51 athletes to the Games to compete in 11 sports.

Archery

Recurve

Compound

Badminton

Boxing

Canoeing

Cycling

Track 
Endurance

Sprint

Keirin

Gymnastics

Acrobatic

Artistic

Judo

Karate

Sambo

Shooting

Table tennis

References

Nations at the 2019 European Games
European Games
2019